Two ships of the Royal Australian Navy (RAN) have been named HMAS Warrnambool, for the city of Warrnambool, Victoria.

, a Bathurst-class corvette launched in 1941 and lost in 1947 following a collision with a mine
, a Fremantle-class patrol boat launched in 1980 and decommissioned in 2005

Battle honours
Ships named HMAS Warrnambool are entitled to carry three battle honours:
Darwin 1942
Pacific 1942–45
New Guinea 1942

References

Royal Australian Navy ship names